Herménégilde Boulay (March 20, 1861 – May 18, 1942) was a Canadian politician, farmer, manufacturer, merchant and trader. He was elected to the House of Commons of Canada as a Member of the historical Conservative Party in 1911 to represent the riding of Rimouski. He was defeated in the election of 1908, 1917, 1921 and 1930. The elections of 1917 and 1921 he contested in Matane.

Born in St. Donat, Canada West, Boulay served as mayor of Sayabec, Quebec, before entering federal politics.

External links
 

1861 births
1942 deaths
Members of the House of Commons of Canada from Quebec
Conservative Party of Canada (1867–1942) MPs
Unionist Party (Canada) MPs